Wilbur Lee Martin (July 8, 1928 – August 19, 1984) was an American skeleton racer who competed in the late 1940s. He finished fourth in the men's skeleton event at the 1948 Winter Olympics in St. Moritz.

References

1948 men's skeleton results
Wallechinsky, David (1984). "Skeleton (Cresta Run)". In The Complete Book of the Olympics: 1896–1980. New York: Penguin Books. p. 577.

1928 births
1984 deaths
American male skeleton racers
Olympic skeleton racers of the United States
Skeleton racers at the 1948 Winter Olympics